Seifert is a German surname. Notable people with the surname include:

Alfred Seifert (1850–1901, Czech German painter
Benjamin Seifert (born 1982), German cross country skier
Bill Seifert (born 1939), American racecar driver
Else Seifert (1879–1968), German photographer
Emil Seifert (1900–1973), Czech football manager
Ernst Seifert (1855–1928), German organ builder
Frank Seifert (born 1972), German footballer
Friedrich Seifert (born 1941), German mineralogist
George Seifert (born 1940), American football coach
Harald Seifert, East German bobsledder
Herbert Seifert (1897–1996), German mathematician
Ilja Seifert (1951–2022), German politician
Jan Seifert (born 1968), German footballer
Jaroslav Seifert (1901–1986), Czech writer, poet, and journalist
Johannes Seifert (1915–1943), German Luftwaffe ace
Kathi Seifert, American businesswoman
Lewis Seifert (born 1962), American academic
Manfred Seifert (1949–2005), German football player
Maria Seifert (born 1981), German Paralympian athlete
Marty Seifert (born 1972), Minnesota politician
Michael Seifert (disambiguation), multiple people
Rainer Seifert (born 1947), German field hockey player
Richard Seifert (1910–2001), Swiss British architect
Rudolf Seifert, East German slalom canoer
Sandra Seifert (born 1984), Taiwanese fashion model
Sebastian Seifert (born 1978), Swedish handballer
Stephen Seifert (born 1973), American folk musician
Steven Seifert (born 1950), American medical toxicologist
Tim Seifert (born 1994), New Zealand cricketer
Toni Seifert (born 1981), German rower
Walter Seifert (1921–1964), German man who attacked a school
Zbigniew Seifert (1946–1979), Polish jazz violinist

See also
Siebert
Seyfert (disambiguation)
Siefert

German-language surnames
Surnames from given names